Pedro Isaac Mulens (born December 22, 1985 in Camagüey) is a male wrestler from Cuba.  He competes in the men's -66 kg Greco-Roman division.  He represented Cuba at the 2012 Summer Olympics.  He was knocked out by eventual champion Kim Hyeon-woo in the main draw, before losing a bronze medal match to Steeve Guénot in the repechage.

References

External links
 
 

Living people
1985 births
Sportspeople from Camagüey
Cuban male sport wrestlers
Wrestlers at the 2012 Summer Olympics
Olympic wrestlers of Cuba
World Wrestling Championships medalists
Pan American Games medalists in wrestling
Pan American Games gold medalists for Cuba
Wrestlers at the 2011 Pan American Games
Medalists at the 2011 Pan American Games
20th-century Cuban people
21st-century Cuban people